MICC may refer to:

 Military-industrial-congressional complex
 Millicom International Cellular S.A., which trades on the Nasdaq Stock Market under the symbol 'MICC'.
 Mineral-insulated copper-clad cable
 Manchester International Conference Centre, a conference centre in Manchester, England.
 McNeil Island Corrections Center, a former prison
 Ministry of Immigration and Cultural Communities (Quebec)